Gavin Astor, 2nd Baron Astor of Hever (1 June 1918 – 28 June 1984), was an English soldier, publisher, peer, and member of the Astor family.

Biography
Astor was the eldest son of John Jacob Astor, 1st Baron Astor of Hever (1886–1971), and Lady Violet Elliot-Murray-Kynynmound (1889–1965). He had two younger brothers, Hugh (1920–1999) and John (1923–1987). His mother had two children, Mary (1910–2003) and George (1912–1997), from her previous marriage to Lord Charles Petty-Fitzmaurice (1874–1914).

He was educated at Eton College and New College, Oxford, before joining the Life Guards, where he reached the rank of captain.

Business positions included the chairmanship of the Times Publishing Company and life presidency of Times Newspapers Ltd. He was appointed High Sheriff of Sussex in 1955.

He inherited the barony and Hever Castle in Kent on the death of his father in 1971.

In 1955, he founded the Astor of Hever Trust, a charity aimed to collect donations for arts, medicine, religion, education, conservation, youth, and sport.

Marriage and children
Astor married Lady Irene Haig (1919–2001), youngest daughter of Field Marshal Douglas Haig, 1st Earl Haig (1861–1928), and Dorothy Maud Vivian (1879–1939), on 4 October 1945. They had five children:

John Jacob "Johnny" Astor VIII, 3rd Baron Astor of Hever, DL (16 June 1946) he married, Fiona Diana Harvey on 1 July 1970 and they were divorced in 1990. They have three daughters. He remarried Elizabeth Mackintosh in 1990. They have two children.
Bridget Nancy Astor (16 February 1948) she married Count Arthur Tarnowski in 1980 and they were divorced in 1986. They have two sons. She remarried Geofrey Smith in 1989. They have one daughter: 
John Sebastian Gavin Tarnowski (1981)
Lucian Francis Philip Tarnowski (1984)
Morya Morvenna Irene Smith (1987)
Elizabeth Louise Astor (1 March 1951) she married David Herring in 1979 and they were divorced in 1981. She remarried David Ward in 1985. They have two children:
Oliver Gavin Joseph Ward (1985)
Victoria Mary Ward (1987)
Sarah Violet Astor (born 30 September 1953) she married George Lopes on 22 February 1975. They have three children:
Harry Marcus George Lopes (7 October 1977) he married Laura Rose Parker Bowles on 6 May 2006. They have one daughter and twin sons: 
Eliza Lopes (17 January 2008)
Gus Lopes (29 December 2009)
Louis Lopes (29 December 2009)
Lorna Violet Lopes 6 December 1979) she married Ian Lyle on 21 January 2016. 
Sabrina Helen Lopes (4 November 1983)
Philip Douglas Paul Astor (4 April 1959)

Astor died of cancer in 1984 at his home near Tarland, Scotland.  He was succeeded in the barony by his eldest son Johnny.

References

External links

Alumni of New College, Oxford
1918 births
English people of American descent
English people of German descent
English people of Irish descent
English people of Scottish descent
British Life Guards officers
1984 deaths
Barons Astor of Hever
Gavin
Deputy Lieutenants of Sussex
Lord-Lieutenants of Kent
Deaths from cancer in Scotland
High Sheriffs of Sussex
Livingston family
People educated at Eton College
People from Hever, Kent